Lithuania has been participating at the Deaflympics since 1993 and  has earned a total of 49 medals.

Medal tallies

Summer Deaflympics

Winter Deaflympics

See also
Lithuania at the Paralympics
Lithuania at the Olympics

References

External links
Deaflympics official website
2017 Deaflympics

Nations at the Deaflympics
Parasports in Lithuania
Lithuania at multi-sport events